Schimia is a genus of moths in the family Sesiidae.

Species
Schimia flavipennis Gorbunov & Arita, 1999
Schimia flava (Moore, 1879)
Schimia tanakai Gorbunov & Arita, 2000

References

Sesiidae